Coprosma cuneata, is a shrub in the Rubiaceae family, native to New Zealand.

Coprosma cuneata is a shrub with clusters of small dark green narrow leaves. The leaves are curved and 9-16mm  by 2mm. They are widest at the tip, and have  a tuft of small hairs between the base of the pairs of leaves. The fruit is red and persists on the shrub.

Conservation status
In both 2004 and 2009 it was deemed to be "Unthreatened" under the New Zealand Threat Classification System, and this classification was reaffirmed in 2018.

References

External links
Coprosma cuneata occurrence data from Australasian Virtual Herbarium

Flora of New Zealand
cuneata
Taxa named by Joseph Dalton Hooker
Plants described in 1844